Tetragonia cristata is a member of the genus Tetragonia endemic to Australia.

It blooms between July and September producing yellow flowers.

Often found on clay flats and amongst granite outcrops it has a scattered distribution throughout the Mid West region of Western Australia where it grows in sandy or clay soils.

References

cristata
Flora of Western Australia
Plants described in 1983